3,4,8-Trimethoxyphenanthrene-2,5-diol is one of the 17 phenanthrenes found in the extract of the stems of the orchid Dendrobium nobile.

References 

Phenanthrenoids
Methoxy compounds